Elie Ikangu (born October 4, 1986 in Paris, France) is a football midfielder who played for New York Red Bulls of Major League Soccer.

Ikangu played with the youth team at French team Le Havre AC. He joined English Football League Two (fourth tier) club Darlington in 2005, but was released in January 2006 having failed to progress from the youth team. He played on trial for the reserve team of Premier League club Middlesbrough, then moved to the United States, where, after a preseason trial, he signed a developmental contract with New York Red Bulls in 2006. He was let go by the team in February 2008. He is of Congolese descent.

References

1986 births
Living people
Footballers from Paris
French footballers
French expatriate footballers
Association football midfielders
Le Havre AC players
Darlington F.C. players
New York Red Bulls players
Major League Soccer players
French sportspeople of Democratic Republic of the Congo descent
French expatriate sportspeople in the United States
Expatriate soccer players in the United States
Black French sportspeople